Jürgen Kröger (16 November 1856 in Haale, Germany – 27 February 1928 in Aukrug) was a German architect, active from 1880 to 1920. He bore the title "(kaiserlicher) Baurat" in 1908, and was an architectural advisor to German Emperor Wilhelm II.  Kröger is most notable for his construction of Protestant church buildings.  The poet Timm Kröger was his uncle.

Biography
Kröger began his training in 1873 at the Göttsche master carpentry school in Hohenwestedt.  He passed his architecture exams with honors in 1880 from a school in Eckernförde.  Then he worked as a construction specialist in the construction division of the War Department in Altona, Hamburg.  In 1882, he was hired to work in the Berlin office of the famous architect Johannes Otzen.  In 1888, Kröger became independent and primarily erected Protestant churches, especially in the neogothic style, in the following decades.  His greatest achievements included the Gare de Metz-Ville.  At its inauguration on 17 August 1908, Kaiser Wilhelm II appointed him "(kaiserlicher) Baurat".

Work
For a complete listing, see the corresponding article in the German Wikipedia.

1856 births
1928 deaths
19th-century German architects
People from Rendsburg-Eckernförde
20th-century German architects